Let's Go' is the seventh studio album by Australian singer David Campbell, released in November 2011. 
The album is a collection of songs from the 1980s.

Campbell toured the album nationally in 2012.

Track listing
CD/DD (88697987582)
 "Shout to the Top" (Paul Weller) - 3:32
 "Tainted Love" (Ed Cobb) - 2:37
 "Let's Go" (Jack Hues, Nick Feldman)- 4:55
 "I'm Your Man" (George Michael) - 4:48
 "Don't You Want Me" with Josie Lane (Jo Callis, Adrian Wright, Philip Oakey)- 3:59
 "Goody Two Shoes" (Adam Ant, Marco Pirroni)- 3:14
 "True" (Gary Kemp) - 4:39
 "Missing You" (Charles Sandford, John Waite, Mark Leonard) - 3:43
 "Come on Eileen" (Kevin Adams, James Patterson, Kevin Rowland)- 4:39
 "I Can Dream About You" (Dan Hartman) - 3:20
 "Only You" (Vince Clarke) - 3:40
 "You Make My Dreams" (Daryl Hall & John Oates) - 2:57

Charts

Weekly charts

Year-end charts

External links
 "Let's Go" by David Campbell at Discogs

References

2011 albums
Covers albums
Sony Music Australia albums
David Campbell (Australian musician) albums